Bill Hager (February 6, 1947 – October 13, 2021) was an American politician from Florida. He served four terms in the Florida House of Representatives as a Republican, representing parts of coastal Palm Beach County from 2010 to 2018.

Biography
Hager was born in Pipestone, Minnesota. He later moved to Iowa, where he attended the University of Northern Iowa, graduating with a bachelor's degree in mathematics. He then moved to Hawaii, where he worked as a middle school math teacher, and attended the University of Hawaii, receiving his Master of Education in educational psychology in 1972. Hager then attended the University of Illinois College of Law, graduating with his Juris Doctor in 1974.

He moved back to Iowa, where he worked as legal counsel to the Republican caucus in the Iowa House of Representatives in 1975. Hager then worked as an Assistant Attorney General, and then as the state's Deputy Insurance Commissioner. He took a job working as chief of staff to United States Congressman Tom Tauke from 1979 to 1980, and then returned to his work in insurance, serving as the Insurance Commissioner of Iowa from 1986 to 1990. During his service as Insurance Commissioner, he was elected to the West Des Moines School Board.

Hager then moved to the state of Florida in 1990. He was elected to the Boca Raton City Council in 2002, and served as the city's Deputy Mayor from 2004 to 2005.

Florida House of Representatives
When incumbent State Representative Adam Hasner was unable to seek re-election in 2010 due to term limits, Hager ran to succeed him in the 87th District, which stretched from Hypoluxo to Deerfield Beach in Broward County and Palm Beach County. He won the Republican primary uncontested and faced Hava Holzhauer, an assistant states attorney in the general election. The Palm Beach Post endorsed Hager over Holzhauer, calling him "the better candidate" despite his "near-obsessive focus on support for an Arizona-style immigration law in Florida" due to his other positions and Holzhauer's limited knowledge of the issues.

In 2012, when the state's legislative districts were redrawn, Hager was moved into the 89th District, which included most of the territory that he had previously represented in the 87th District. He faced an unexpectedly strong challenge in Tom Gustafson, the Democratic nominee and a former State Representative who served as Speaker of the Florida House of Representatives from 1988 to 1990. Gustafson replaced Pamela Goodman, the previous nominee, after she withdrew due to her husband's deteriorating health.

He attacked Hager for being "a shill to the insurance industry," and a "puppet" for his party, noting, "Bill Hager hasn't had an original thought in his mind since he left Iowa." The Sun-Sentinel praised both candidates as "highly qualified," but, "in a tough decision," endorsed Hager, praising him as "a knowledgeable, open and accessible lawmaker." Ultimately, Hager narrowly defeated Gustafson to earn his second term in the legislature, receiving 53% of the vote to Gustafson's 47%.

He died of lung disease on October 13, 2021, in Fargo, North Dakota, at age 74.

References

External links
Florida House of Representatives - Bill Hager

|-

1947 births
2021 deaths
University of Northern Iowa alumni
University of Hawaiʻi alumni
University of Illinois College of Law alumni
Republican Party members of the Florida House of Representatives
21st-century American politicians
People from Boca Raton, Florida
People from Pipestone, Minnesota
Iowa Republicans